The 1984–85 Kansas Jayhawks men's basketball team represented the University of Kansas during the 1984–85 NCAA Division I men's basketball season.

Roster
Ron Kellogg
Danny Manning
Calvin Thompson
Greg Dreiling
Cedric Hunter
Milt Newton
Mark Turgeon
Tad Boyle
Mark Pellock
Altonio Campbell
Chris Piper
Rodney Hull
Jeff Johnson
Don Kennedy
Jim Pelton

Schedule

References

Kansas Jayhawks men's basketball seasons
Kansas
Kansas
Kansas Jay
Kansas Jay